The 2011–12 Ohio Bobcats women's basketball team represented Ohio University during the 2011–12 NCAA Division I women's basketball season. The Bobcats, led by fourth year head coach Semeka Randall, played their home games at the Convocation Center in Athens, Ohio as a member of the Mid-American Conference. They finished the season 14–18 and 6–10 in MAC play.

Preseason
The preseason poll and league awards were announced by the league office on November 1, 2011. Ohio was picked fifth in the MAC East.

Preseason women's basketball poll
(First place votes in parenthesis)

East Division
 
 
 
 
 Ohio

West Division

Tournament champs
Toledo

Preseason All-MAC

Source

Schedule

|-
!colspan=9 style=| Non-conference regular season

|-

|-

|-

|-
!colspan=9 style=| MAC regular season

|-
!colspan=9 style=| MAC Tournament

|-

|-

Awards and honors

All-MAC Awards

References

Ohio
Ohio Bobcats women's basketball seasons
Ohio Bobcats women's basketball
Ohio Bobcats women's basketball